"I've Been This Way Before" is a song written and performed by Neil Diamond. It was released as the second single from Diamond's 1974 album Serenade. "I've Been This Way Before" was Neil Diamond's third No. 1 on the Easy Listening chart and also peaked at No. 34 on the Billboard Hot 100 chart.

Billboard magazine stated that the song was "stronger lyrically" than recent Neil Diamond songs and also praised the vocal performance and the arrangement.  Cash Box said that "this moody ballad gleams," describing that a "simple piano opening builds lovingly into a rich mix of strings and things with Diamond's voice rising confidently above it all."

See also
List of number-one adult contemporary singles of 1975 (U.S.)

References

1975 singles
Neil Diamond songs
Songs written by Neil Diamond
1974 songs
Song recordings produced by Tom Catalano